The Hunter Expressway is a  long controlled-access highway in New South Wales, Australia. It was previously known as the F3 to Branxton link or Kurri Kurri Corridor during the planning stage. It has two lanes in each direction, running generally north west from the Pacific Motorway at the Newcastle Link Road interchange to the eastern end of the Belford Bends Deviation on the New England Highway north of Branxton. The road allows traffic to bypass the Maitland area, Lochinvar, Greta and Branxton. The expressway opened on 22 March 2014.

History
What is now the Hunter Expressway was originally proposed in 1988 under the name Kurri Kurri Corridor. The New South Wales Department of Planning approved those changes on 19 August 2007.

Pre-construction work
The Roads & Traffic Authority obtained approval in July 2006 to allow the construction of the road to be staged.
This did not mean that the road would be opened in stages but that preparatory work including relocation of high voltage power lines, gas mains, telecommunication cabling, water and sewer mains and the South Maitland Railway line could be carried out prior to commencing construction of the road. This was done because the relocation of services during road construction may have caused unpredictable delays.

The construction of a new bridge to carry the South Maitland railway line over the new road was put out to tender in 2007. However, despite the tender closing date being put back four times, the tender was not awarded.

At the time, it was anticipated that the $253 million pre-construction work would be completed in mid 2008 and construction of the road would commence immediately after the pre-construction was completed.

Funding uncertainty
Prior to the 2007 Australian federal election, the then coalition government pledged to fund the construction of the road as part of the Auslink II funding plan and the then opposition pledged to match the government funding commitment. On the Sunday immediately after the election, the federal member for Hunter and member of the incoming Labor government, Joel Fitzgibbon, announced in an interview that he "was no longer convinced that it was the best option for the area and wanted a new independent assessment of the project." A $1 million study, titled the "Lower Hunter Transport Needs Study" was "commissioned in part to cost the bypass".

As part of the 2008 federal budget, money that the previous government had intended to spend on infrastructure during the 2008–09 budget year was instead placed into a fund while a newly created authority, Infrastructure Australia carried out studies to determine which projects should be funded and which should not.

Despite making no budget allocation for the road in 2007, the Government of New South Wales described the road as "critical to regional development in the Lower Hunter". In their October 2008 submission to Infrastructure Australia, the NRMA also listed the road as one of four "Regional Road Infrastructure Priorities".

The road was recommended as a "top priority" on an interim list of 94 high priority projects presented to the minister, Anthony Albanese by Infrastructure Australia on 19 December 2008. A final report was due to be presented in March 2009.

Regional development
Several developments in the region, including the proposed new township of Huntlee and new subdivisions in Branxton, Cessnock and Maitland have been described as being "held back" pending the construction of this road, since the existing road network would be unable to accommodate the increased traffic that would be generated.

A study completed in October 2008 identified an area of land at Buchanan, adjacent to an interchange of the proposed link as the preferred location for a regional freight hub. The report indicated that uncertainty over the construction of the road "may delay a final decision regarding the preferred location for Freight Hub".

Construction
Following the announcement of funding in the 2009 federal budget, a decision was made to separate the road into two separate projects. The  eastern section, from the M1 to Kurri Kurri, was put out to tender under an alliance agreement in July 2009. The private sector consortium selected to partner with the RTA to build that section included Thiess, Parsons Brinckerhoff and Hyder Consulting. Detailed planning began in early 2010, and construction began around June 2010.

The contract for the eastern section of the Hunter Expressway was finalised at $825 million, thus allowing major construction to begin. Thiess general manager NSW/ACT Brendan Donohue said the project would be technically complex as the corridor included a number of possible mine subsidence areas.
On 11 August 2010, Premier Kristina Keneally, and other MPs including Anthony Albanese, Kerry Hickey and Joel Fitzgibbon met at Buchanan for the turning of the first sod.

The remaining  section from Kurri Kurri to Branxton was tendered in 2010 as a design and construct contract. Abigroup were awarded that contract in October 2010

Opening
The original contracted opening date was 20 September 2013, but construction delays caused the date to be deferred several times. The expressway was officially opened by Deputy Prime Minister Warren Truss and State Roads Minister Duncan Gay in the morning of 21 March 2014, and was opened to traffic in the evening of 22 March 2014.

Interchanges

Newcastle interchange
The most easterly interchange of the Hunter Expressway. It connects the expressway with the Pacific Motorway and the Newcastle Link Road. The interchange has been significantly upgraded, with three additional bridges across the M1 in addition to the existing one and the provision of high speed on and off ramps from the new road towards Sydney while maintaining full grade separation. However motorists are unable to exit northbound to the Pacific Motorway from the Hunter Expressway or access the Hunter Expressway when heading southbound on the Pacific Motorway. The Buchanan Interchange and John Renshaw Drive have been designated to provide access between the expressway and the Pacific Highway to the north.

Buchanan interchange
A full interchange has been provided on John Renshaw Drive near the ends of George Booth Drive and Buchanan Road. As part of the construction of that interchange, the southern end of Buchanan Road was relocated to connect to a new roundabout constructed on the site of a smaller roundabout that had previously been built at the end of George Booth Drive.

Branxton interchange
A full interchange has been constructed between Greta and Branxton, with a link to the existing highway via a new bridge across the Main Northern railway line and a link to a new roundabout on Wine Country Drive south of Branxton.

New England Highway connection
The north western end of the link road crosses over the Main Northern railway line and joins onto the existing highway. When the new road opened, it became the main through road and existing highway on the northern side of Branxton was diverted to provide local access to Standen Drive.

Road junction list

See also

 New England Highway
 List of freeways in Australia
 List of highways in New South Wales

References

External links

 

Highways in New South Wales
Roads in the Hunter Region